Pentatonix: The World Tour  is the ninth concert tour by American a cappella group Pentatonix to promote their greatest hits. The tour began on May 11, 2019, in Oakland.

Background and development
On February 7, 2019, the group announced they were going on a world tour. Dates were first announced for North America. Rachel Platten was announced as the opening act. On March 10, 2020, the group announced the European leg was postponed to May 1, 2023, amid the ongoing coronavirus pandemic.

Set list
This set list is from the concert on March 06, 2023, at the Star Vista in Singapore. It is not intended to represent all shows from the tour.

"Sing"
"Perfume Medley"
"Can't Sleep Love"
"Aha!" 
"The Sound of Silence" 
"Love Me When I Don't"
"The Lucky Ones Medley"" 
"Daft Punk"
"Kevin's Fifth" 
"Shallow" 
"Side" 
"White Winter Hymnal" 
"Matt and Kevin audience participation "  
"90s Dance Medley"
"Hallelujah" 

Encore
 "My Heart With You" 
"Bohemian Rhapsody"

Tour dates

References

2019 concert tours
2020 concert tours
2023 concert tours
Pentatonix concert tours
Concert tours postponed due to the COVID-19 pandemic